Miss Evers' Boys is an American made-for-television drama starring Alfre Woodard and Laurence Fishburne that first aired on February 22, 1997, and is based on the true story of the four-decade-long Tuskegee Syphilis Study. It was directed by Joseph Sargent and adapted by Walter Bernstein from the 1992 stage play of the same name, written by David Feldshuh. It received twelve nominations for the 1997 Primetime Emmy Awards, ultimately  winning five, including Outstanding Television Movie and the President's Award (awarded for programming that best explores social or educational issues).

Plot 
The film tells the story of a medical study with covert goals organized by the U.S. Department of Health and Human Services, conducted on poor African American men in the years 1932–1972 at Tuskegee University, designed to study the effects of untreated syphilis. The story is told from the perspective of the small town nurse Eunice Evers (Alfre Woodard) who is well aware of the lack of treatment, but feels her role is to console the involved men, many of whom are her close friends.

In 1932 she is sent to help Dr. Brodus (Joe Morton) and Dr. Douglas (Craig Sheffer) to help them "treat" rural black men in the town of Tuskegee, Alabama. She is sent around town to tell the people that the government is funding their treatment for free, but unbeknownst to them the government will soon run a study that requires them to go without any form of real treatment. She then comes across three men in an abandoned schoolhouse: Willie Johnson (Obba Babatundé), Bryan Hodman, and "Big" Ben Washington, who agree for treatment.

The study selected 412 men infected with the disease and promised them free medical treatment for what was called "bad blood". The movie shows Miss Evers suggesting the term as a strategy to withhold information about syphilis from the men. The men received fake long-term treatment, which involved giving them mercury and placebos even after penicillin was discovered as a cure.  When Caleb Humphries (one of the test subjects who left the experiment) joins the Army during World War II and is treated and cured by penicillin, he returns to tell how he was cured and tries to get help for his friend. But none of the hospitals would help because the test subjects were placed on a list that stated they should not receive medical treatment because they were participants in the experiment. The survivors of the study did receive treatment and financial compensation after the US Senate investigated in the 1970s, and eventually a formal apology from President Bill Clinton.

Cast

Awards and nominations

References

External links 
 
 
 
 
 
 
 

1990s English-language films
1997 drama films
1997 films
1997 television films
African-American drama films
American drama television films
American films based on plays
Films about medical malpractice
Films about race and ethnicity
Films about racism
Films about syphilis
American films based on actual events
Films directed by Joseph Sargent
Films scored by Charles Bernstein
Films set in Alabama
Films set in the 1930s
Films set in the 1940s
Films with screenplays by Walter Bernstein
HBO Films films
Primetime Emmy Award for Outstanding Made for Television Movie winners
1990s American films